Natalya Turkalo (née Maydabura; born 25 June 1982) is a Ukrainian handball player for SPR JKS Jarosław and the former player for Ukrainian national team.

References

1982 births
Living people
Ukrainian female handball players